Alexander or Alex Bowman is the name of:

Alexander Bowman (Australian politician) (1838–1892)
Alexander Bowman (Irish politician) (1854–1924)
Alexander Hamilton Bowman (1803–1865), American engineer
Alex Bowman (born 1993), American race car driver

See also
Bowman (disambiguation)